Magara Young Boys is a football club based in Magara, Burundi. The team plays in the Burundi Ligue A.
The team was founded in March 2012 in Bugarama district,Rumonge Province by Alexis Bandyatuyaga (president) and Shaka Mariamma (manager).

Colours and badge 
Magara Young Boys' colors are yellow, black and red.

Magara Young Boys badge has the image of a phoenix rising and clawing a football and the inscription

Stadium 
Magara Young Boys play their home matches at Stade Urunani.
The stadium has a capacity of 7,000 and is based in the city of Buganda.

Squad

Management and staff

References 

Football clubs in Burundi
Bujumbura